Afzal Khan (Urdu: افضل خان), better known as Jan Rambo, is a Pakistani actor, director, producer and comedian. 

He rose to fame by playing a janitor nicknamed Jan Rambo on PTV's famous comedy show Guest House (1991). He later assumed Jan Rambo as his unofficial screen name taken from the Sylvester Stallone character John Rambo. People on the TV stage set had nicknamed him Jan Rambo due to his striking resemblance to the Hollywood actor.

Career 

Afzal Khan began his acting career from stage dramas in Islamabad. He acted in a few plays by PTV that were aired only in Islamabad and Peshawar.

He has made the record of signing the most number of featured films in a single day, that is 26. He has appeared in more than 150 movies.

He was cast as Jan Rambo (a janitor) in PTV's comedy series Guest House in 1991. It was an instant hit and Rambo became the most popular character of the series.

After his success as Jan Rambo, he began to get offers from movies. In 1992, he signed his first movie and became a mainstream Lollywood actor. However, his image of a comedy actor earned him mostly comedy characters. He tried to do some serious movies but wasn't as successful.

He was as a judge on a TV talent show as well as on a dance show.

In 2011, he hosted a morning show on Apna Channel, a Pakistani television channel.

He also appeared in the popular Pakistani drama series Naagin on Geo Kahani.

In 2018 he turned director with the A-Plus TV drama Taqdeer, in which he also played the lead role alongside his wife Sahiba and another veteran actor, Moammar Rana.

Personal life
He was born in Havelian, Abbottabad, Pakistan and is married to fellow Lollywood actress Sahiba Afzal, who is the daughter of veteran film actress Nisho.

Selected filmography

Films

Television

See also 
 List of Lollywood actors

References

External links

1966 births
Living people
Pakistani male comedians
Pakistani male film actors
Pakistani male stage actors
Hindkowan people
Pakistani television hosts